Milou van der Heijden (born 18 December 1990) is a retired professional squash player who represented the Netherlands. She reached a career-high world ranking of World No. 29 in March 2019.

References

External links 

1990 births
Living people
Dutch female squash players
People from Veldhoven
Competitors at the 2017 World Games
20th-century Dutch women
21st-century Dutch women